Andrew Melvin Gooden III (born September 24, 1981) is an American former professional basketball player who is currently a broadcaster for NBC Sports Washington. The power forward played 14 seasons in the National Basketball Association (NBA). Gooden played college basketball for the Kansas Jayhawks, where he was a consensus first-team All-American in 2002. He earned NBA All-Rookie First Team honors with the Memphis Grizzlies after they selected him in the first round of the 2002 NBA draft with the fourth overall pick.

High school career
As a senior at El Cerrito High School, Gooden led his Gauchos to the 1999 California Interscholastic Federation Boys' Division III championship game.  Washington Union High School (led by future NBA guard DeShawn Stevenson) won the championship game over El Cerrito HS by a score of 77–71.

College career
Gooden joined fellow freshmen Nick Collison and Kirk Hinrich for the 1999–2000 season at Kansas. Although at times, Gooden was frustrated with the way things were going his freshman year, he finally adjusted to coach Roy Williams' system.

In his freshman year, the Jayhawks went 24–10 and lost to Duke in the round of 32 during the 2000 NCAA basketball tournament. The next season, the Jayhawks went 26–7 and fell to Illinois in the 2001 NCAA basketball tournament Sweet Sixteen.

In 2002, he led the nation in rebounding and was named NABC National Player of the Year. The Jayhawks went 33–4, including 16–0 in Big 12 Conference play to win Kansas its first conference championship since 1998. The Jayhawks advanced to their first Final Four in the 2002 NCAA basketball tournament since 1993, however, they lost to the eventual national champion Maryland in the semifinal.

For being named NABC Player of the Year for 2002, Gooden's jersey (#0) was retired in 2003. The ceremony occurred at halftime of a Kansas home game with Kansas State in what would have been Gooden's senior year had he not foregone his senior year for the NBA.

Professional career
Gooden declared himself for the draft after his junior year. Out of Kansas, Gooden was selected as the 4th overall pick by the Memphis Grizzlies in the 2002 NBA draft. In March 2003, Gooden and Gordan Giriček were traded to the Orlando Magic for Mike Miller, Ryan Humphrey, and two draft picks.

Cleveland Cavaliers

On July 23, 2004, the Cleveland Cavaliers acquired Gooden, Anderson Varejão, and Steven Hunter for Tony Battie and two second-round draft picks from the Orlando Magic via trade.

Gooden re-signed with the Cavaliers for three more years on August 14, 2006. He agreed to a three-year, $23 million contract.

In the 2006–07 NBA season, he averaged 11.1 points per game and 8.5 rebounds per game.

Chicago Bulls
On February 21, 2008, at the 2007–08 season's trade deadline, Gooden was traded by the Cavs (along with Larry Hughes, Cedric Simmons, and Shannon Brown) to the Chicago Bulls as a part of a three-team, 11-player deal involving the Seattle SuperSonics.

Sacramento Kings
On February 18, 2009, at the 2008–09 season's trade deadline, Gooden was traded to the Sacramento Kings in a six-player deal that included Andrés Nocioni and Cedric Simmons.

On March 1, Gooden was bought out of his contract making him a free agent after playing just one game for the Kings.

San Antonio Spurs
On March 5, 2009, Gooden signed with the San Antonio Spurs for the remainder of the season.

Dallas Mavericks

On July 25, 2009, Gooden posted a message on his Twitter page that said "Dallas Here I Come!!!"  Dallas Mavericks owner, Mark Cuban, retweeted Gooden's tweet, adding "Welcome Drew.. !".  On July 30, Gooden officially signed with the Mavericks.

Washington Wizards / Los Angeles Clippers
On February 13, 2010, Gooden was traded to the Washington Wizards along with Josh Howard, James Singleton, and Quinton Ross for Caron Butler, Brendan Haywood, and DeShawn Stevenson. Four days later, he was traded again, this time to the Los Angeles Clippers as part of a three-team, six-player trade that sent Antawn Jamison from Washington to the Cleveland Cavaliers, Žydrūnas Ilgauskas, a 2010 first-round pick and the rights to Emir Preldžič from the Cavaliers to Washington, Al Thornton from Los Angeles to Washington, and Sebastian Telfair from Los Angeles to Cleveland. Gooden changed his number from #90 to #0 during his tenure with the Clippers.

Milwaukee Bucks
On July 1, 2010, Gooden agreed to a 5-year/$32 million contract with the Milwaukee Bucks, which would make the Bucks his ninth team in as many seasons in the league. On April 9, 2011, he recorded his first career triple-double in a win over the Cavaliers with 15 points, 13 rebounds, and 13 assists.

On March 14, 2012, Gooden recorded his second career triple-double in a win over the Cavaliers with 15 points, 10 rebounds, and 13 assists.

On July 16, 2013, the Bucks waived Gooden using the NBA's amnesty clause.

Second stint with the Wizards
On February 26, 2014, Gooden signed a 10-day contract with the Washington Wizards. On March 8, 2014, he signed a second 10-day contract with the Wizards. On March 18, 2014, he signed with the Wizards for the rest of the season.

On July 18, 2014, Gooden re-signed with the Wizards. In the team's season opener on October 29, 2014, against the Miami Heat, Gooden was named the starting power forward in what was his first of just seven starts for the season. He subsequently scored a season-high 18 points and did not top that mark for the rest of the season.

On July 13, 2015, Gooden again re-signed with the Wizards.

Gooden's final NBA game was played on April 13, 2016 in a 109 - 98 win over the Atlanta Hawks where he recorded one point and one steal in 2 minutes of playing time. July 7, 2016, the Wizards declined their option on Gooden's contract, making him an unrestricted free agent.

BIG3 League
In February 2018, Drew Gooden joined Ice Cube's BIG3 basketball league as co-captain of 3's Company.

Personal life

Gooden is half Finnish; his father, Andrew Gooden, met Drew's mother, Ulla, while playing pro basketball in Äänekoski, Finland. Gooden's parents divorced later on, and he stayed with his father in California. In August 2014, Gooden attempted to get Finnish citizenship in order to play for their national team, but he failed to do so before the 2014 FIBA Basketball World Cup.

Gooden enjoys playing the piano.

At the beginning of the 2006–07 season, Gooden appeared with a patch of hair on the back of his head. He refers to this hair style as a "duck tail." Gooden said, "It is drawing a lot of attention ... One thing I've found out is even negative publicity is good publicity. At least I had the (guts) to do it." He claims women love it: "I went from getting compliments to now being sexy."

In 2012, Gooden opened a Wingstop restaurant franchise in Altamonte Springs, Florida.

In 2016, Gooden returned to the University of Kansas and earned his degree in communications.

NBA career statistics

Regular season

|-
| align="left" | 
| align="left" | Memphis
| 51 || 29 || 26.1 || .443 || .304 || .697 || 5.8 || 1.2 || .7 || .4 || 12.1
|-
| align="left" | 
| align="left" | Orlando
| 19 || 18 || 28.6 || .498 || .000 || .738 || 8.4 || 1.1 || .8 || .7 || 13.6
|-
| align="left" | 
| align="left" | Orlando
| 79 || 17 || 27.0 || .445 || .214 || .637 || 6.5 || 1.1 || .8 || .9 || 11.6
|-
| align="left" | 
| align="left" | Cleveland
| 82 || 80 || 30.8 || .492 || .179 || .810 || 9.2 || 1.6 || .9 || .9 || 14.4
|-
| align="left" | 
| align="left" | Cleveland
| 79 || 79 || 27.5 || .512 || .333 || .682 || 8.4 || .7 || .7 || .6 || 10.7
|-
| align="left" | 
| align="left" | Cleveland
| 80 || 80 || 28.0 || .473 || .167 || .714 || 8.5 || 1.1 || .9 || .4 || 11.1
|-
| align="left" | 
| align="left" | Cleveland
| 51 || 51 || 30.7 || .444 || .000 || .728 || 8.3 || 1.0 || .7 || .6 || 11.3
|-
| align="left" | 
| align="left" | Chicago
| 18 || 14 || 31.0 || .461 || .000 || .813 || 9.3 || 1.7 || .7 || 1.3 || 14.0
|-
| align="left" | 
| align="left" | Chicago
| 31 || 27 || 29.6 || .457 || .000 || .866 || 8.6 || 1.4 || .8 || .5 || 13.1
|-
| align="left" | 
| align="left" | Sacramento
| 1 || 0 || 26.0 || .556 || .000 || 1.000 || 13.0 || 2.0 || .0 || .0 || 12.0
|-
| align="left" | 
| align="left" | San Antonio
| 19 || 1 || 16.8 || .490 || .000 || .789 || 4.4 || .2 || .2 || .2 || 9.8
|-
| align="left" | 
| align="left" | Dallas
| 46 || 11 || 22.4 || .467 || .167 || .809 || 6.9 || .6 || .6 || 1.1 || 8.9
|-
| align="left" | 
| align="left" | L.A. Clippers
| 24 || 22 || 30.2 || .492 || .000 || .921 || 9.4 || .9 || .6 || .3 || 14.8
|-
| align="left" | 
| align="left" | Milwaukee
| 35 || 18 || 24.6 || .431 || .150 || .794 || 6.8 || 1.3 || .6 || .5 || 11.3
|-
| align="left" | 
| align="left" | Milwaukee
| 56 || 46 || 26.2 || .437 || .291 || .846 || 6.5 || 2.6 || .8 || .6 || 13.7
|-
| align="left" | 
| align="left" | Milwaukee
| 16 || 0 || 9.4 || .328 || .200 || .688 || 1.9 || .4 || .3 || .4 || 3.3
|-
| align="left" | 
| align="left" | Washington
| 22 || 0 || 18.0 || .531 || .412 || .889 || 5.2 || .7 || .5 || .3 || 8.3
|-
| align="left" | 
| align="left" | Washington
| 51 || 7 || 16.9 || .399 || .390 || .773 || 4.4 || 1.0 || .4 || .2 || 5.4
|-
| align="left" | 
| align="left" | Washington
| 30 || 0 || 10.2 || .320 || .171 || .643 || 2.8 || .4 || .3 || .4 || 2.7
|- class="sortbottom"
| style="text-align:center;" colspan="2"| Career
| 790 || 500 || 25.5 || .462 || .257 || .760 || 7.1 || 1.1 || .7 || .6 || 11.0

Playoffs

|-
| align="left" | 2003
| align="left" | Orlando
| 7 || 7 || 33.4 || .400 || .000 || .722 || 12.7 || .6 || .4 || .9 || 14.0
|-
| align="left" | 2006
| align="left" | Cleveland
| 13 || 13 || 21.7 || .529 || – || .944 || 7.5 || .6 || .2 || .2 || 8.2
|-
| align="left" | 2007
| align="left" | Cleveland
| 20 || 20 || 30.3 || .493 || .000 || .769 || 8.0 || 1.0 || .5 || .5 || 11.4
|-
| align="left" | 2009
| align="left" | San Antonio
| 4 || 0 || 17.8 || .333 || .000 || 1.000 || 3.8 || .3 || .3 || .3 || 7.3
|-
| style="text-align:left;"| 2014
| style="text-align:left;"| Washington
| 10 || 0 || 14.6 || .368 || .000 || .750 || 4.3 || .4 || .3 || .4 || 3.4
|-
| align="left" | 2015
| align="left" | Washington
| 10 || 0 || 17.8 || .377 || .462 || .769 || 5.5 || .8 || .2 || 1.0 || 6.8
|- class="sortbottom"
| style="text-align:center;" colspan="2"| Career
| 64 || 40 || 23.7 || .449 || .324 || .793 || 7.2 || .7 || .5 || .3 || 9.2

References

External links

1981 births
Living people
African-American basketball players
All-American college men's basketball players
American men's basketball players
American people of Finnish descent
Basketball players from Oakland, California
Big3 players
Chicago Bulls players
Cleveland Cavaliers players
Dallas Mavericks players
Kansas Jayhawks men's basketball players
Los Angeles Clippers players
Memphis Grizzlies draft picks
Memphis Grizzlies players
Milwaukee Bucks players
Orlando Magic players
Parade High School All-Americans (boys' basketball)
People from El Cerrito, California
Power forwards (basketball)
Sacramento Kings players
San Antonio Spurs players
Washington Wizards players
21st-century African-American sportspeople
20th-century African-American people
American men's 3x3 basketball players